Giovanni Bacci (7 March 1857, Belforte all'Isauro – 9 August 1928, Milan) was an Italian journalist and politician. He was one of the main leaders of the Italian Socialist Party.

Biography
Giovanni Bacci was born in Belforte all'Isauro, near Urbino, on 7 March 1857. He was journalist and director of Rivista di Ferrara and La Provincia di Mantova.

In 1903 he became a member of the Italian Socialist Party and in 1912 he was appointed director of Avanti!.

In 1921 Bacci was elected Secretary of the Socialist Party and led his party in the general election of the same year. Under his leadership the PSI was confirmed as the first party in the country with 24.7% of votes, but it lost 33 seats. After the election, Bacci resigned as party's leader.

After the formation of the Fascist dictatorship of Benito Mussolini, Bacci was banned from politics and died few years later in 1928 in Milan.

References

1857 births
1928 deaths
Italian Socialist Party politicians
Italian Aventinian secessionists